The Men's 200m Backstroke event at the 2007 Pan American Games took place at the Maria Lenk Aquatic Park in Rio de Janeiro, Brazil on 18 & 19 July. A total of 15 swimmers initially swam the race.

Medalists

Results

References
 Official Site

Backstroke, Men's 200